The 2018 British National Track Championships were a series of track cycling competitions held from 26–28 January 2018 at the Manchester Velodrome. They are organised and sanctioned by British Cycling, and were open to British cyclists. The championships were sponsored by HSBC.

Medal summary

Men's Events

Women's Events

References

National Track Championships
British National Track Championships